Dennaton Games is an independent Swedish video game developer founded by programmer Jonatan Söderström and artist Dennis Wedin. The company name is a portmanteau of the founders' names.

History
Jonatan Söderström is an indie game developer who previously developed games in the Game Maker engine as a hobby. Söderström said in an interview that he needed to actually start making money off of creating games, so he decided to undertake a more sizeable project. He contacted his friend Dennis Wedin, an artist, and together they formed Dennaton Games, after which they began the development of Hotline Miami, followed by Hotline Miami 2.

On New Years Eve, December 2020, Jonatan Söderström posted a tweet mentioning Dennaton's new, unannounced game. "It is a passion project so I'm not sure who will enjoy it. But I'm sure some people will be horrified and others delighted!"

Developed games

References

Video game development companies
Indie video game developers
Video game companies of Sweden
Video game companies established in 2012
Swedish companies established in 2012
Companies based in Gothenburg